Day of the Cobra is a 1980 Italian poliziottesco film directed by Enzo G. Castellari.

Production
Director Enzo G. Castellari initially approached Vasile with a script written by Vasile's son. The boxing film project was shelved and Vasile offered Castellari to direct Day of the Cobra. Day of the Cobra was written by Aldo Lado who was initially going to direct the film. Lado's story was initially set right after World War II in Trieste. Castellari's film is set in the present day and he imagined the film a "homage to Chandler.

Castellari cast many actors who he had previously worked with, including Franco Nero and Massimo Vanni. He also cast some of his family members such as his brother Enio Girolami and daughter Stefania.

Day of the Cobra was shot on location in San Francisco, Genoa and at Incir-de Paolis in Rome.

Cast 
 Franco Nero: Larry Stanzani
Sybil Danning: Brenda 
William Berger: Godschmidt
Mario Maranzana: Cases 
Licinia Lentini: Lola Alberti
Enio Girolami: Mastino 
Massimo Vanni: Beltrame 
Carlo Gabriel Sparanero: Tim 
Romano Puppo: Silvestri

Release
Day of the Cobra was released on August 12, 1980. The film grossed a total of 489,000,000 Italian lira on its domestic release. The score of the film by Paolo Vasile was released by Cinevox.

Reception
According to the German book Der Terror führt Regie: "Day of the Cobra is technically pure cinema. The film suffers a bit in its pandering to American viewing habits." Online film database AllMovie gave the film two stars out of five, stating that a "key flaw is the maddening story line, which manages to be over-complicated and half-baked all at once." and that "elements of the story simply rehash other, better thrillers, like The French Connection." The review noted that the film contains "a few worthwhile action set pieces. The rooftop chase that opens the film is quite exciting and there is also a memorably tongue-in-cheek scene where Nero dukes it out with a transvestite in an empty disco. However, the viewer must wade through a lot of clichés and dull passages to get to these moments"

See also
 List of Italian films of 1980
 List of crime films of the 1980s

References

External links

1980 films
Films directed by Enzo G. Castellari
Poliziotteschi films
Italian detective films
Police detective films
Italian crime action films
1980s crime action films
1980s Italian films